John Barry Stanchfield (March 13, 1855 – June 25, 1921) was an American lawyer and politician from New York. He was a prominent litigator and the Democratic gubernatorial candidate in 1900.

Life

John B. Stanchfield was born in Elmira, New York on March 13, 1855, the son of Dr. John K. Stanchfield. He graduated from Amherst College in 1876, and from Harvard Law School in 1878. He commenced the practice of law in Elmira in partnership with David B. Hill, later Governor of New York (1885–1891). Afterwards he was a partner in the Elmira law firm of Reynolds, Stanchfield & Collin (named Sayles & Evans since 1945).

Stanchfield was District Attorney of Chemung County from 1880 to 1885; and Mayor of Elmira, New York from 1886 to 1888. He married Clara S. Spaulding on September 2, 1886, and they had two children. He was a member of the New York State Assembly for Chemung Co. in 1895 and 1896; and was Minority Leader in 1896. Afterwards he removed to New York City, and became a partner in the New York City law firm of Chadbourne, Stanchfield & Levy (now Chadbourne & Parke).

In the 1900 New York state election, he ran for Governor of New York, but was defeated by Republican Benjamin B. Odell, Jr. In 1903, Stanchfield was the Democratic candidate for U.S. Senator from New York, but was defeated by the incumbent Republican Thomas C. Platt.

Stanchfield was a delegate to the 1904 and 1912 Democratic National Conventions, and a delegate to the New York State Constitutional Convention of 1915.

He died of kidney failure at his home in Islip at the age of 66, and was buried in Elmira.

Cases
Shortly after his removal to New York City, he appeared for Richard Albert Canfield and secured the dismissal of an indictment, earning a fee of $30,000.
 
In 1909, he defended F. Augustus Heinze against accusations of misapplying funds of the Mercantile National Bank, and received a fee of $800,000 after Heinze's acquittal.

He represented the State of New York at the impeachment trial of Governor William Sulzer in 1913, and at the trial of the suspended Socialist assemblymen (Louis Waldman, August Claessens, Charles Solomon) in 1920.

In 1915, he secured the release of Harry Kendall Thaw from the Matteawan State Hospital for the Criminally Insane.

References

"John B. Stanchfield, Lawyer, Dies at 66" in NYT on June 26, 1921

External links
 His gubernatorial campaign button at the Museum of the City of New York
 Political Graveyard (gives wrong year for U.S. Senate election)

1855 births
1921 deaths
Politicians from Elmira, New York
Mayors of places in New York (state)
Members of the New York State Assembly
County district attorneys in New York (state)
Amherst College alumni
Harvard Law School alumni
Deaths from kidney failure